C. gardneri may refer to:
 Ceropegia elegans, a plant species found in Sri Lanka
 Chlaenosciadium gardneri, a flowering plant species

See also 
 Gardneri